Midvale is a city in Salt Lake County, Utah, United States. It is part of the Salt Lake City, Utah Metropolitan Statistical Area. Midvale's population was 34,124 according to 2019 estimates from the U.S. Census Bureau.

Midvale is home to the Shops at Fort Union, located on the East side of the city and the Bingham Junction economic center, located on the west side of the city. Midvale is centrally located in the most populous county in Utah, with the direct interchange between I-15 and I-215 located in the middle of the city. Midvale is one of the few cities in Utah to be home to two direct TRAX lines.

Geography
According to the United States Census Bureau, the city has a total area of 5.8 square miles (15.1 km), all land. The western border of Midvale is the Jordan River that flows down the center of the valley.

Climate
This climatic region is typified by large seasonal temperature differences, with warm to hot summers and cold winters.  According to the Köppen Climate Classification system, Midvale has a humid continental climate, abbreviated "Dfb" on climate maps.

Under the Köppen climate classification, Sandy has a humid subtropical climate (Cfa) or a humid continental climate (Dfa) depending on which variant of the system is used.

Demographics

According to the US Census Bureau, it is estimated that Midvale is home to 33,636 people. It is estimated that the population identifies as: 76.9% non-Hispanic White, 23.6% Hispanic or Latino, 4.3% Hawaiian or other Pacific Islander, 3.4% Black or African American, and 0.4% American Indian.

It is estimated that Midvale is home to 12,412 households with an owner occupancy rate of 43.3%. The median price of a home in 2018 was estimated at $241,200 whereas the 2020 projection for the median house price has climbed to $338,000 in less than two years.

It is estimated that 64.5% of Midvale's population is between the ages of 18 and 65. With 27% of the population below 18 and 8.5% above 65. It is also estimated that 49.7% of Midvale is female.

Law and government
Midvale City has a nonpartisan mayor-council form of government. The Mayor and five Council members are elected to four-year terms. The current mayor of Midvale is Marcus Stevenson. Current City Council members include Quinn Sperry, Paul Glover, Heidi Robinson, Bryant Brown, and Dustin Gettel.

Midvale Fire and Police are furnished by arrangement with the Unified Police and Fire of Salt Lake County. Consequently, Midvale no longer fields its own police or fire departments.  The current head of the Unified Police Department Midvale Precinct is Police Chief Randy Thomas and the Unified Fire Department is headed by Chief Dominic Burchett.

Education
Jordan School District was the primary school district in Midvale until 2009. In 2007, citizens voted to split Jordan School District to create 2 separate school districts - Jordan School District and the newly created Canyons School District. The Canyons School District is now the primary school district located in Midvale. It began operation at the beginning of the 2009–10 school year.

Midvale has 4 elementary schools (Copperview Elementary, East Midvale Elementary, Midvale Elementary, and Midvalley Elementary), two middle schools (Midvale Middle School and Union Middle School), and one High School (Hillcrest High School).

Media
The Midvale City Journal is a monthly newspaper delivered to homes in Midvale City. The Journal covers local stories in Sports, Education, City Council, and Local Life.

Some scenes from the mini-series The Stand as well as scenes from the movies Halloween 4: The Return of Michael Myers, Gentlemen Broncos, and The Sandlot, were filmed in downtown Midvale, including the interior of an old-fashioned drugstore by the name of Vincent Drug. The store stayed in business and retained products in packaging over 50 years old for this type of display purpose. Vincent Drug shut down in 2003.

History

Located in the central part of the Salt Lake Valley, and next to the Jordan River, Midvale was an early target for settlers in Utah. Permanent homes began as early as the 1850s, with one of the earliest homes still preserved today. The population grew quickly in the 1870s thanks to its central location, the use of railroad, and its connection to the mining in Bingham Canyon, the western area of present-day Midvale became an important industrial area for Utah. To support this growth, the eastern area of present-day Midvale provided agriculture and housing.

Incorporation

People in the area, presumably, started calling the area Midvale, due to its central location in the valley. In 1909 Midvale officially became a city and in the 1910 census had a population of 1,760.

Growth

Fort Union Area

Fort Union, historically Union, was an early settlement area on the eastern edge of present-day Midvale. When Midvale annexed the Fort Union Area, it brought an established housing population. However, it did not just provide the city with a much larger population base, it also brought the city the shops of Fort Union. The shops provide both shopping and office space for Midvale.

Bingham Junction Area 

Bingham Junction, originally known as the Sharon Steel site, is on the western border of Midvale and is roughly 446 acres in size. The area originally started seeing economic development as early as 1871 as a slag site for mining, which operated as such until 1958. Upon testing, it appeared to have large amounts of lead, arsenic and heavy metals, rendering the property unusable. Through mediation, help from the EPA and other parties, the area underwent a major cleanup and restoration project that saw its name removed from the NPL in 2006.

Since Bingham Junction's removal from the NPL, the area underwent major changes. It brought about thousands of new households to the city. In connection with the added residential, major corporations moved to the area, where Overstock, CHG, and Savage now use as their headquarters. Also other major companies have brought their operation to the area, including Marriott, Zagg and IHC. Entertainment followed with the first ever Top Golf in Utah resides in the Bingham Junction area. As other important shopping centers such as Winco and other dining options. The EPA now considers this a success story and estimates as of 2018 there are 56 on site businesses with at least 2,646 employees.

Bingham Junction is also home to a stop on the red line, that goes from the western edges of Salt Lake County to the University of Utah, Utah's flagship university.

Jordan Bluffs Area

Following in the success of the Bingham Junction Area, the area known as Jordan Bluffs is beginning the early phase of similar redevelopment. Jordan Bluffs is situated south of Bingham Junction and was originally part of the Sharon Steel slag site. It compromises 351 acres in the south west region of Midvale.

Jordan Bluffs is in the beginning phases of redevelopment, but current proposals could see an additional 3,500 housing units and over 1,000,000 square feet of office space within the next ten years.

Transportation

Roadways 
Midvale operates under a grid system as the rest of Salt Lake County. However, as most cities originally operated under their own grid system, Midvale City was one of the last to transition to the county. I-15 runs down the center of Midvale, with I-215's interchange with I-15 meeting in the 7200 and state region in Midvale.

Bus 
The Utah Transit Authority (UTA) operates a bus system that reaches into the city including a sky service bus route. Bus routes serve nearby light rail stations, multiple commercial districts (including the Shops at Fort Union and the State Street commercial district), office parks, and government offices. The ski bus route operates along the 7200 south corridor.

Rail

UTA's TRAX light rail system operates two separate rail line routes in Midvale, serving both the Red Line and Blue Line. The city is home to three light rail stations: The Red Line has Bingham Junction, and the Blue Line has Midvale Fort Union and Midvale Center stations.

Economy

CHG Healthcare Services, Arctic Circle Restaurants, Veritas Funding, LLC, Sportmans' Warehouse, Zagg and Overstock.com are headquartered in Midvale.

School Improvement Network, an education consulting company, moved its national headquarters to Midvale in 2011.

Notable people
Corbin Allred – Actor
Zane Beadles – NFL player for the Jacksonville Jaguars and the Denver Broncos.
Mary N. Cook – LDS First Counselor in the general presidency of the Young Women
Richard Dutcher – Actor/director/writer/producer
J. Thomas Fyans – LDS General Authority
Gregg Hale – guitar player for multi-platinum selling British band Spiritualized
Kristin Hodson – is a Licensed Clinical Social Worker and prominent voice on the topic of sexual health
Christen Jensen – Educator and college president
Don L. Lind – American scientist, naval officer and aviator, and NASA astronaut
Dick Motta – NCAA Collegiate and NBA coach
Kent Ryan – Former NFL player with the Detroit Lions
Josh Savage – Former NFL player for the Tennessee Titans and New Orleans Saints
Scott Young – Former NFL player for the Philadelphia Eagles and Cleveland Browns

References

External links
 Midvale official website

 
Populated places established in 1851
Wasatch Front
Cities in Utah
Salt Lake City metropolitan area
1851 establishments in Utah Territory
Cities in Salt Lake County, Utah